Luftverkehrsgesellschaft m.b.H. (L.V.G. or LVG) was a German aircraft manufacturer based in Berlin-Johannisthal, which began constructing aircraft in 1912, building Farman-type aircraft. The company constructed many reconnaissance and light bomber biplanes during World War I.

The raid on London in 1916 was conducted by one LVG C.IV. It dropped its bombs near London Victoria station, but was shot down by French anti-aircraft gunners on its way home.

Aircraft

Own designs

LVG B.I - reconnaissance and later trainer aircraft
LVG B.II - reconnaissance and later trainer aircraft
LVG B.III - trainer aircraft
LVG C.I - first tandem-seated aircraft with observer-manned machine gun
LVG C.II - reconnaissance aircraft
LVG C.IV - reconnaissance aircraft
LVG C.V - reconnaissance aircraft
LVG C.VI - more than 1,000 aircraft of this type were produced
LVG C.VIII - prototype only
LVG C.IX - not finished
LVG D 10
LVG D.II - prototype only
LVG D.III - prototype only
LVG D.IV - prototype only
LVG D.V - prototype only
LVG D.VI - prototype only
LVG E.I - experimental aircraft with two machine guns
LVG G.I - bomber aircraft
LVG G.II - triplane
LVG G.III - triplane bomber designed by Schütte-Lanz but built by LVG, the Schütte-Lanz G.V

Other aircraft manufactured at LVG
Albatros B.II
Albatros C.II
Gotha G.IV
Sablatnig SF 5

Further reading 

 Grosz, Peter M.: LVG C.VI, Windsock Datafile Nr. 17, Albatros Prod. Ltd, Berkhamsted 1989
 Heinz J. Nowarra: Flugzeuge 1914-1918. München 1959.
 Karlheinz Kens, Hans Müller: Die Flugzeuge des ersten Weltkriegs. München 1966, .
 Karl R. Pawlas: Deutsche Flugzeuge 1914-18. Nürnberg 1976, .
 Günter Kroschel, Helmut Stützer: Die deutschen Militärflugzeuge 1910-18''. Wilhelmshaven 1977, .

Defunct aircraft manufacturers of Germany